Belenkoye is a rural locality (a selo) and the administrative center of Belyanskoye Rural Settlement, Borisovsky District, Belgorod Oblast, Russia. The population was 1,466 as of 2010. There are 10 streets.

Geography 
Belenkoye is located 11 km southwest of Borisovka (the district's administrative centre) by road. Zozuli is the nearest rural locality.

References 

Rural localities in Borisovsky District